Oscar Schmidt Jr. (March 25, 1896 – March 24, 1973) was a United States Navy sailor and a recipient of the United States military's highest decoration—the Medal of Honor—for his actions in World War I.

Early life

Schmidt grew up in Philadelphia and worked in the Philadelphia Shipyard.

Military career
Schmidt joined the Navy from his birth state of Pennsylvania and served during and after World War I, rising to the rank of Chief Gunner's Mate.

For this act, he was awarded the Medal of Honor.

Medal of Honor citation
Rank and organization: Chief Gunner's Mate, U.S. Navy. Place and date: At sea, October 9, 1918. Entered service at: Pennsylvania. Born: March 25, 1896, Philadelphia, Pa. G.O. No.: 450, 1919.

Citation:

For gallant conduct and extraordinary heroism while attached to the U.S.S. Chestnut Hill, on the occasion of the explosion and subsequent fire on board the U.S. submarine chaser 219. Schmidt, seeing a man, whose legs were partly blown off, hanging on a line from the bow of the 219, jumped overboard, swam to the sub chaser and carried him from the bow to the stern where a member of the 219's crew helped him land the man on the afterdeck of the submarine. Schmidt then endeavored to pass through the flames amidships to get another man who was seriously burned. This he was unable to do, but when the injured man fell overboard and drifted to the stern of the chaser Schmidt helped him aboard.

Death and legacy
Schmidt died the day before his 77th birthday and was buried at Arlington National Cemetery, Arlington County, Virginia.

See also

List of Medal of Honor recipients
List of Medal of Honor recipients for World War I

References

Bibliography

1896 births
1973 deaths
Military personnel from Pennsylvania
United States Navy personnel of World War I
Burials at Arlington National Cemetery
United States Navy Medal of Honor recipients
Military personnel from Philadelphia
United States Navy sailors
World War I recipients of the Medal of Honor